The Saigon Hi-Tech Park (abbr.: SHTP) is a park for high technology enterprises located 15 km from downtown Ho Chi Minh City, opposite to Thu Duc University Village, along the Hà Nội Highway and on the future Line 1 of the HCMC metro (2014). The park covers an area of 326 ha (95% utilised) and is currently being expanded to 913 ha. High-tech investors are given preferential treatments here with land leases and taxation, as well as support for customs services.

Several high-tech companies chose SHTP, notably:
 Japanese Nidec, (TSE:65940, NYSE:NJ, hard disk drive motors) with multiple factories under Nidec, Nidec Copal and Nidec Sankyo flagships and total investment of US $500 million for a planned 20,000 workforce, 
US Intel (NASDAQ:INTC) with US $1 billion registered investment to build the largest chip assembly & test plant in the world, 
French Air Liquide  (EPA:AI), gases for industry, health and the environment, 
Danish Sonion, miniature and hearing components who employs more than 2,000 workforce in SHTP, 
US Jabil (NYSE:JBL)  electronic supplier, 
Italian Datalogic (STAR:DAL.MI) bar codes readers.

In total 26 companies were in operations in 2011, employing more than 11,000 employees and a total registered investment of US $2 billions.

This park was aimed at promoting Ho Chi Minh City and Vietnam as a hi-tech investor friendly destination. The new phase is focusing on education, bio-technology, start-up incubators, training centres, software, R&D, telecom. This park is one of two hi-tech parks in Vietnam, the other being Hoa Lac Hi-tech Park situated in the western outskirts of Hanoi near the University of Sciences and Technologies of Hanoi.

Map

References

External links
Saigon Hi-tech Park official website
French Ambassador visit to SHTP - 2011

See also 
 Hoa Lac Hi-tech Park
 Danang Hi-tech Park

Buildings and structures in Ho Chi Minh City
Science parks in Vietnam